The 2017 United Bowl was the championship game of the 2017 Indoor Football League season. It was played between the Intense Conference Champion Arizona Rattlers and the United Conference Champion Sioux Falls Storm. The game was played at Denny Sanford Premier Center in Sioux Falls, South Dakota. The Rattlers won the game by a score of 50–41.

This was the Sioux Falls Storm's seventh consecutive United Bowl appearance and first loss, snapping a 6-game championship streak. It was the Arizona Rattlers' first United Bowl appearance in their first season in the IFL after joining from the Arena Football League.

Venue
The game was played at Denny Sanford Premier Center in Sioux Falls, South Dakota, as the Sioux Falls Storm had the home field advantage by cause of having a better regular season record.

Background

Arizona Rattlers

On October 17, 2016, the Arizona Rattlers announced their move to the IFL from the Arena Football League. They started on a 2-game losing streak heading into their first bye week before defeating the Colorado Crush at home 71–29. The Rattlers finished the season with a conference best 12–4, including a season-ending 8 game win streak, earning the first seed in the Intense Conference. In the Intense Conference championship, they defeated the Nebraska Danger at home by a score of 62–36.

Sioux Falls Storm

In 2017, the Storm began the regular season with 8 straight wins, including a 40–29 victory over the Arizona Rattlers in week 1, before a 44–36 loss to the Wichita Falls Nighthawks. They finished the season with a 14–2 record, earning the top seed in the United Conference and the best record in the league, which they secured with a 45–24 victory over the Iowa Barnstormers in week 18. In the United Conference championship, they were victorious in their rematch against the Barnstormers by a score of 66–32.

Box score

References

United Bowl
United Bowl
Arizona Rattlers
Sioux Falls Storm
Sports competitions in South Dakota
United Bowl
United Bowl